The Teusacá River is a river in the Eastern Hills of Bogotá and on the Bogotá savanna. It is a left tributary of the Bogotá River, Colombia. The upper part of the Teusacá River basin has a páramo ecosystem with the páramos of Chingaza, El Verjón and Cruz Verde surrounding the river. The San Rafael Reservoir in La Calera, important water source for the Colombian capital, is sourced by the Teusacá River.

Etymology 
Teusacá is derived from Muysccubun, the indigenous language of the Muisca, who inhabited the Altiplano Cundiboyacense before the Spanish conquest. Teusacá was the name of a settlement in the Muisca Confederation, possibly in the Teusacá basin between Guasca and Usaquén.

Description 

In this municipality the San Rafael Reservoir, important water source of Bogotá, is located in the Teusacá River basin. The Teusacá River continues northward through Guasca and flows to the northwest in Sopó and Tocancipá.

Climate and vegetation 

The vegetation ranges from páramo to Andean forests with characteristic species Illex kunthiana, Myrcianthes leucoxyla, Myrsine guianensis, Miconia squamulosa, Clethra fimbriata, Arcythophylum muticum, Baccharis rupicola, Hydrocotyle bonplandii, Hypericum thuyoides, Paepalanthus columbiensis, Cladonia clavatum and Weinmannia tomentosa. The total number of bird species counted is 307, with other fauna as mammals, reptiles and amphibians registered. The Chingaza National Natural Park and Páramo de Cruz Verde are located to the east of the Teusacá River.

Geology 

The Teusacá River basin is located in a synclinal in the Eastern Ranges of the Colombian Andes, with the Late Cretaceous Guadalupe Group, the Upper Cretaceous to Paleocene Guaduas, the Paleogene Cacho and Bogotá Formations, and younger unconformable Neogene formations present in the Teusacá synclinal. The synclinal is bounded to the west by the Teusacá Fault, a north-south trending thrust fault dipping to the east, thrusting the members of the older Guadalupe group on top of the Guaduas Formation. In the Teusacá River basin, 25 quarries for carbon and construction materials are active.

Gallery

See also 

List of rivers of Colombia, Muisca toponyms
Eastern Hills, Bogotá
Bogotá savanna
Juan Amarillo, Fucha, Tunjuelo River

References

Bibliography

External links 
  Sistema Hídrico, Bogotá

Rivers of Colombia
Bogotá River
Rivers
Geography of Cundinamarca Department
Geography of Bogotá
Muysccubun